Bruno De Costa (born 15 December 1938) is a Canadian former sports shooter. He competed in the skeet event at the 1972 Summer Olympics.

References

1938 births
Living people
Canadian male sport shooters
Olympic shooters of Canada
Shooters at the 1972 Summer Olympics
People from Drumheller
Sportspeople from Alberta